Annette Marianne Volfing, FBA (born 5 February 1965) is a literary scholar and academic. Since 2008, she has been Professor of Medieval German Literature at the University of Oxford.

Career 
Born on 5 February 1965, Volfing completed her undergraduate degree at St Edmund Hall, Oxford, graduating in 1985; she returned there to carry out her doctoral studies; her DPhil was awarded in 1993 for her thesis "A commentary on Der Meide Kranz by Heinrich von Muegeln". She was elected to a fellowship at Oriel College, Oxford, the following year, alongside a lectureship at the University of Oxford (where she was promoted to reader in 2006 and Professor of Medieval German Literature two years later).

According to her university profile, Volfing is a "medievalist with particular interest in later medieval religious, mysical, philosophical or allegorical writing"; her British Academy adds that her research focuses on "mysticism; allegory; learned discourse (vernacular reception of the artes); didacticism; courtly romance; orientalism; discourses of gender and violence" in medieval German literature.

Publications 

 Heinrich von Mügeln: >Der meide kranz<. Münchener Texte und Untersuchungen zur deutschen Literatur des Mittelalters 111 (Tübingen: Niemeyer, 1997).
 John the Evangelist and Medieval German Writing: Imitating the Inimitable (Oxford: Oxford University Press, 2001).
 Medieval Literacy and Textuality in Middle High German. Reading and Writing in Albrecht’s Jüngerer Titurel (New York: Palgrave Macmillan, 2007).
 (Co-editor with Burhhard Hasebrink, Hans-Jochen Schiewer and Almut Suerbaum) Innenräume in der Literatur des deutschen Mittelalters. XIX. Anglo-German Colloquium Oxford 2005 (Tübingen: Niemeyer, 2008).
 (Co-editor with Sarah Bowden) Punishment and Penitential Practices in Medieval German Writing, King's College London Medieval Studies (Woodbridge: Boydell and Brewer, 2018).

Honours and awards 
In 2015, Volfing was elected a Fellow of the British Academy, the United Kingdom's national academy for the humanities and social sciences.

References 

Living people
Fellows of the British Academy
Fellows of Oriel College, Oxford
1965 births